Lesbian, gay, bisexual, and transgender (LGBT) persons in the U.S. state of Michigan may face some legal challenges not faced by non-LGBT residents. Same-sex sexual activity is legal in Michigan, as is same-sex marriage. Discrimination on the basis of both sexual orientation and gender identity is unlawful since July 2022, was re-affirmed by the Michigan Supreme Court - under and by a 1976 statewide law, that explicitly bans discrimination "on the basis of sex". The Michigan Civil Rights Commission have also ensured that members of the LGBT community are not discriminated against and are protected in the eyes of the law since 2018 and also legally upheld by the Michigan Supreme Court in 2022. In March 2023, a bill passed the Michigan Legislature by a majority vote - to formally codify both "sexual orientation and gender identity" anti-discrimination protections embedded within Michigan legislation. Michigan Governor Gretchen Whitmer signed the bill on March 16 2023.

Michigan is home to a vibrant LGBT community. East Lansing and Ann Arbor were the first cities in the United States to pass LGBT discrimination protections, doing so in 1972. Pride parades have been held in the state's most populous city, Detroit, since 1986, and today attract thousands of people. While a majority of Michiganders support same-sex marriage, the formally Republican-controlled Legislature has mostly ignored LGBT-related legislation, and as such progress had been slow (and had thus mostly come from the courts and local municipalities).

Legality of same-sex sexual activity

Sexual acts between persons of the same sex are legal in Michigan. They had been criminalized until the state's sodomy laws, which applied to both homosexuals and heterosexuals, were invalidated in 2003 by the United States Supreme Court's decision in Lawrence v. Texas.

Recognition of same-sex relationships

In 2004, voters approved a constitutional amendment, Michigan Proposal 04-2, that banned same-sex marriage and civil unions in the state. It passed with 58.6% of the vote.

Same-sex marriage
On January 23, 2012, a lesbian couple filed a lawsuit, DeBoer v. Snyder in United States District Court for the Eastern District of Michigan, challenging the state's ban on adoption by same-sex couples in order to jointly adopt their children. On March 21, 2014, U.S. District Judge Bernard Friedman ruled the state's ban on same-sex marriage unconstitutional. Attorney General Bill Schuette filed for an emergency stay of his ruling with the Sixth Circuit Court of Appeals. On Saturday, March 22, 2014, four of Michigan's 83 county clerks opened their offices for special hours and issued more than 300 marriage licenses to gay and lesbian couples. Later that day, the Sixth Circuit stayed Judge Friedman's order until March 26. On March 25, 2014, the Sixth Circuit stayed the ruling indefinitely. On March 28, 2014, U.S. Attorney General Eric Holder announced the Federal Government will recognize the same-sex marriages performed on March 22.

On November 6, 2014, the Sixth Circuit reversed the lower court's ruling and upheld Michigan's ban on same-sex marriage. On June 26, 2015, the U.S. Supreme Court ruled in Obergefell v. Hodges that same-sex couples have a nationwide right to marry, legalizing same-sex marriage in the United States, and Michigan.

Domestic partnerships

The Michigan Supreme Court ruled that the constitutional amendment forbidding recognition of same-sex relationships meant that public employers in Michigan could not legally grant domestic partnership benefits to their employees. A law in effect since December 2011 banned most public employers, though not colleges and universities, from offering health benefits to the domestic partners of their employees. It did not extend to workers whose benefits are established by the Michigan Civil Service Commission. On June 28, 2013, U.S. District Judge David M. Lawson issued a preliminary injunction blocking the state from enforcing its law banning local governments and school districts from offering health benefits to their employees' domestic partners. He made that injunction permanent on November 12, 2014, when he ruled in Bassett v. Snyder that Michigan's restrictions on domestic partnership benefits were not related to a legitimate government purpose. He distinguished his ruling from the Sixth Circuit's ruling in DeBoer: "It is one thing to say [as in DeBoer] that states may cleave to the traditional definition of marriage as a means of encouraging biologically complementary couples to stay together and raise the offspring they produce.... It is quite another to say that a state may adopt a narrow definition of family, and pass laws that penalize those unions and households that do not conform."

Adoption and parenting
Michigan has no statutory ban on same-sex couples adopting, and no Michigan state court has ever interpreted Michigan's statute as prohibiting such adoptions. However, at least one other state court has ruled that unmarried individuals may not jointly petition to adopt.

Two Michigan lesbians, who are raising three children adopted by only one of them, filed a lawsuit known as DeBoer v. Snyder in federal court in January 2012 seeking to have the state's ban on adoption by same-sex couples overturned. and in September amended that suit to challenge the state's ban on same-sex marriage as well.

In December 2012, the Michigan Court of Appeals, an intermediate-level court, ruled in Usitalo v. Landon that the state's courts have jurisdiction to grant second-parent adoptions by same-sex couples.

Following the U.S. Supreme Court's ruling striking down Michigan's ban on same-sex marriage, Michigan courts have been granting adoption rights to same-sex couples.

In September 2019, a judge within Michigan allowed discrimination against LGBT individuals adopting children within adoption agencies, on the technical legal grounds of "fundamental religious beliefs and freedoms". As with all court cases they are subject to appeal in the future.

Discrimination protections

As of March 8, 2023, LGBT people are included in Michigan's Elliott-Larsen Civil Rights Act. As early as the 1973 committee hearing on the Elliott-Larsen Civil Rights Act, members of the LGBT community in Michigan sought to be included in the law. However, actual legislation to do so was not introduced until 2005 when Michigan's first openly LGBT state legislator, Chris Kolb, included it with two other pro-LGBT bills, none of which passed. Since Kolb's 2005 legislation, a number of additional bills have been introduced to add protections for the LGBT community.

On December 23, 2003, Governor Jennifer Granholm issued an executive order prohibiting employment discrimination state-level public sector employment on the basis of sexual orientation. The order only covers employees of the state of Michigan and does not cover public sector employees of county, school, or local-level governments. On November 22, 2007, Governor Jennifer Granholm extended her executive order to include gender identity. This executive order was kept under Governor Rick Snyder.

On March 14, 2013, the Michigan Senate passed, by a 37–0 vote, an emergency harbor dredging funding bill that made private marinas ineligible for a new loan program if they discriminate based on sexual orientation. On March 20, 2013, the Michigan House of Representatives passed the bill by a vote of 106–4. On March 27, 2013, Governor Rick Snyder signed an emergency harbor dredging funding bill that made private marinas ineligible for a new loan program if they discriminate based on sexual orientation.

In January 2019, Governor Gretchen Whitmer issued an executive order prohibiting discrimination on the basis of both sexual orientation and gender identity in all areas of state government employment, including by employers receiving contracts and in grants from the state.

In March 2023, a bill passed the Michigan Legislature by a majority vote - to formally codify both "sexual orientation and gender identity" anti-discrimination protections embedded within Michigan legislation. The bill was signed into law by Governor Gretchen Whitmer on March 8, 2023.

2018 Civil Rights Commission decision
In September 2017, after the Legislature had voted 11 times to reject protecting LGBT people from discrimination, LGBT activists asked the Michigan Civil Rights Commission to declare sexual orientation and gender identity discrimination a form of sex discrimination and as such outlaw it under the Elliott-Larsen Civil Rights Act.

On May 21, 2018, the Commission interpreted the Elliott-Larsen Civil Rights Act as banning discrimination based on sexual orientation and gender identity through the category of sex. The Commission voted 5–0 to interpret existing anti-discrimination laws as including both categories. The Michigan Department of Civil Rights began processing complaints of discrimination on May 22. This decision effectively means that LGBT discrimination is now illegal under state law. The decision was hailed by human rights group, but denounced by conservative groups.

Michigan Attorney General Bill Schuette hit back at the decision, accusing the Commission of overstepping its authority. In July 2018, Schuette said that the decision is "invalid because it conflicts with the original intent of the Legislature as expressed in the plain language of the state's civil rights law". The Commission subsequently reiterated its support for the decision, and the Department of Civil Rights announced that it would continue to investigate discrimination complaints based on sexual orientation and gender identity. "The Michigan Civil Rights Commission is an independent, constitutionally created and established body," Agustin V. Arbulu, director of the Department of Civil Rights, said. "The Commission is not bound by the opinion of the Attorney General. The only recourse is for the courts to determine if issuing the interpretive statement was within the scope of the commission's authority, and that is the appropriate venue for resolving this issue." The Detroit Free Press denounced Schuette for the opinion, calling it a "shameful display of bigotry", also condemning Schuette for his association with President Donald Trump, who had endorsed him for that year's gubernatorial election, which Schuette lost to Democrat Gretchen Whitmer.

EEOC v. R.G. & G.R. Harris Funeral Homes
On March 7, 2018, the United States Court of Appeals for the Sixth Circuit (covering Kentucky, Michigan, Ohio and Tennessee) ruled that Title VII of the Civil Rights Act of 1964 prohibits employment discrimination against transgender people under the category of sex. It also ruled that employers may not use the Religious Freedom Restoration Act to justify discrimination against LGBT people. Aimee Stephens, a transgender woman, began working for a funeral home and presented as male. In 2013, she told her boss that she was transgender and planned to transition. She was promptly fired by her boss who said that "gender transition violat[es] God's commands because a person's sex is an immutable God-given gift." With this decision, discrimination in the workplace based on gender identity is now banned in Michigan.

2020 Michigan business court ruling
In December 2020, a court ruling legally allowed businesses within Michigan to discriminate against LGBT individuals. Michigan Attorney General Dana Nessel is appealing the court's ruling.

Over fifty local municipalities have local human rights ordinances which prohibit discrimination based on sexual orientation and/or gender identity in employment and housing.

Ingham, Washtenaw, and Wayne counties also prohibit discrimination on the basis of sexual orientation and gender identity in government employment.
Holland, Michigan passed on August 19, 2020 a Non-Discrimination ordinance that includes protections against discrimination  for people based on gender identity, gender expression, and sexual orientation in the areas of employment, housing, and public accommodation.

Hate crime law
Since 1992, sexual orientation has been recognized for data collection about hate crimes in Michigan.

In August 2021, a court in Michigan declared that gender identity is implicitly included within the 1992 hate crime laws of Michigan - under the “gender” interpretation.

Conversion therapy

In June 2019, Huntington Woods City Commission passed an ordinance, in a unanimous 5–0 vote, banning conversion therapy in a first reading. As of June 2019, there is no statewide ban on conversion therapy in Michigan. A year later in July 2020, the Madison Heights City Council unanimously approved the amendment to the city's ordinance on minors upon its second reading, effectively prohibiting the practice within the city. Conversion therapy in the community is ineffective, causes suicide and even traumatizing for LGBT individuals. In August 2020, the Michigan City of Royal Oak also passed an ordinance that banned conversion therapy on minors - explicitly with up to 90 days jail or imprisonment and a $500 fine.

Michigan executive order 
In June 2021, the Governor of Michigan Gretchen Whitmer signed an executive order that bans statewide taxpayers dollars or funding going towards conversion therapy on minors. Some cities and counties of Michigan already legally ban conversion therapy by local ordinances.

Gender identity and expression

Birth certificates
On June 30, 2021 a 1978 law and policy within Michigan requiring sexual reassignment surgery - to change sex on an individual's birth certificate was formally declared unconstitutional by the courts. Individuals since June 30, 2021 can formally change sex without sexual reassignment surgery - similar to an individual changing sex on a drivers licence. The Michigan Department of Health and Human Services Director Elizabeth Hertel asked the attorney general in February to examine the constitutionality of the 1978 law that requires a written statement from a physician confirming that "gender-confirmation surgery" has been completed.

Driver's licenses
In November 2019, Michigan implemented a new government software system to change an individuals gender or sex on drivers licenses and I.D.s within the state - by both a signed statutory declaration and a fee. In January 2020, plans were announced to begin offering an "X" marker on driver licenses at an unspecified future date. In November 2021, the Secretary of State said the option would be available "soon".

Transition in childhood 
On October 11, 2022, House Bill 6454 was introduced in the state legislature. If the bill passes, any parent or physician who "consents to, obtains, or assists with a gender transition procedure for a child" will face life in prison for the felony of child abuse in the first degree.

Public opinion
A 2017 Public Religion Research Institute poll found that 63% of Michigan residents supported same-sex marriage, while 29% were opposed and 8% were unsure. Additionally, 70% supported an anti-discrimination law covering sexual orientation and gender identity. 22% were opposed. The PRRI also found that 62% were against allowing public businesses to refuse to serve LGBT people due to religious beliefs, while 31% supported such religiously-based refusals.

Summary table

See also
 Politics of Michigan
 LGBT history in Michigan
 LGBT rights in the United States
 Rights and responsibilities of marriages in the United States
 Law of Michigan

References